The 1990–91 Marquette Warriors men's basketball team represented Marquette University during the 1990–91 men's college basketball season.

Schedule

References 

Marquette Golden Eagles men's basketball seasons
Marquette
Marquette
Marquette